The Ibana is a right tributary of the river Simila in Romania. It flows into the Simila in Băcani.

Hydronymy

The name of the river derives from the Slavic name "Liubana", meaning "valley of love".

References

Rivers of Romania
Rivers of Vaslui County